Bando Osmeña – Pundok Kauswagan, commonly known as BO–PK or BOPK, is a local political party based in Cebu City, Philippines. It is a political party run by the Osmeña family of Cebu since 1987 when Tomas Osmeña first ran for mayor of Cebu City. Although not a registered political party with the Commission on Elections (COMELEC), it has been used by Osmeña and his allies since 1998 when he ran with Alvin Garcia as vice mayor.

History
In 2012, then vice mayor Michael Rama bolted from the party and created his own group named as Barug Team Rama, which was later changed to Partido Barug upon its registration in COMELEC. Its formation has prevented BOPK from achieving its previous feats of landslide victories in 2007 and 2010 local elections when it was only competing with Kugi Uswag Sugbo of former Mayor Alvin Garcia.

It is currently affiliated with the Laban ng Demokratikong Pilipino since 2018. It was previously affiliated with the Liberal Party and Lakas-Christian-Muslim Democrats. Prior to that, it was the city's equivalent of another national party founded by another Osmeña scion, the Probinsya Muna Development Initiative.

In the 2019 elections, BOPK won eight seats in the Cebu City Council and two of its candidates for the House of Representatives namely Rodrigo Abellanosa and Raul del Mar.

BOPK has also supported national candidates specifically for the position of president and vice president. In the 2010 elections, then senators Noynoy Aquino and Mar Roxas were endorsed by the party for president and vice president, respectively. As Roxas sought for the presidency in 2016, the party supported his candidacy along with his vice presidential candidate, then representative of Camarines Sur's 3rd district Leni Robredo. However, there were some barangay officials allied with the party that junked Roxas in favor then Davao City mayor Rodrigo Duterte. Osmeña later revealed that while he supported Roxas, he also helped "protect" Duterte's vote in the city. The party is supporting Robredo for president in the 2022 elections saying that they like "leaders who listen and respond", according to its mayoral candidate and Osmeña's wife, Margarita Osmeña, and senator Tito Sotto for vice president.

Electoral performance

Mayor

Vice mayor

House of Representatives

Cebu City

City council

Representatives to Congress

Cebu City

See also 
 Partido Barug
 Kugi Uswag Sugbo
 Partido Panaghiusa

References 

Local political parties in the Philippines
Regionalist parties
Regionalist parties in the Philippines
Politics of Cebu City
1987 establishments in the Philippines